The Hippocratic Oath is the tradition of ethical oaths  for medical practitioners.

Hippocratic Oath may also refer to:

 "Hippocratic Oath" (DS9 episode), an episode within the Star Trek franchise
 Hippocratic Oath for scientists, a form of the medical oath, adapted for scientists